Rohrer is a surname. Notable people with the surname include:

Anna Rohrer (born 1997), American long distance runner
Ben Rohrer (born 1981), Australian cricketer 
Franz Rohrer (1832–1882), Swiss historical scholar
Heinrich Rohrer (1933–2013), Swiss physicist 
Jason Rohrer (born 1977), American computer programmer, writer, musician and game designer
Jeff Rohrer (born 1958), American football linebacker
Matthew Rohrer (born 1970), American poet
Megan Rohrer (born 1980), American pastor and activist
Raphael Rohrer (born 1985), Liechtenstein footballer
Sam Rohrer (born 1955), American businessman and politician
Seraina Rohrer (born 1977), Swiss film festival director and academic
William Rohrer (1892–?), American baseball player
William G. Rohrer (1909–1989), American businessman and politician